Sir William James Bull, 1st Baronet,  (29 September 1863 – 23 January 1931) was an English solicitor and Conservative politician.

Biography
Bull was the son of Henry Bull, a solicitor, and his wife Cecilia Ann Howard, daughter of James Peter Howard. He was returned to Parliament for Hammersmith in 1900, a seat he held until 1918, and then sat for Hammersmith South until 1929.

Bull was knighted in 1905. That year Walter Long became Chief Secretary for Ireland, and Bull was his Parliamentary Private Secretary. A few years later, the Anti-Socialist Union was set up, and Bull served on its executive committee with R. D. Blumenfeld, while Long was a vice-president. He ran Hammersmith meetings for the Union, with those attending having to sign affidavits of opposition to socialism, and ejected hecklers.

Around 1911 Bull became involved with Frederick H. Crawford in running guns to the Ulster Volunteer Force. He did that in partnership with Herbert Augustus Budden, who was married to his sister Charlotte Annie Howard. They used two firms in Hammersmith, one set up as a front and the other a motor parts supplier set up by Bull's former chauffeur. Police seized over four thousand rifles in a 1913 Hammersmith raid, under the Gun Barrel Proof Act 1868. Their informant was Budden.

Bull was a suffragist, on good terms with the Pankhursts. In 1908 he visited Vera Wentworth in prison. In the discussions before the Representation of the People Act 1918, Maud Palmer, Countess of Selborne of the Conservative and Unionist Women's Franchise Association contacted Bull, at the prompting of Millicent Fawcett, to propose a franchise at the 1916 Speaker's Conference called to start a franchise bill. He involved himself in the question of the minimum age at which a woman should be allowed to vote, starting the bidding with 40, which he later claimed had some support. That was certainly not from the Pankhursts, who held out for adult suffrage. The conference settled by 15 votes to 6 on a minimum age of 30. In 1918 Bull drafted a bill to allow for female conscription. He was admitted to the Privy Council that year.

A week before the Carlton Club meeting of 1922 that put an end to the post-war coalition administration, Bull called a smaller meeting of Conservatives. Walter Long, by then in the House of Lords, was invited. It tested the water for a break with Lloyd George, on a group not from the right wing, and determined that they felt the status quo would lead to a split in the party. Bull was that year created a baronet, of Hammersmith in the County of London.

Bull died in January 1931, aged 67. He is buried in Margravine Cemetery, Hammersmith.

Infrastructure
In the late 1890s Bull chaired the Bridges Committee of the London County Council that oversaw the construction of the Blackwall Tunnel. He made an early proposal for a green belt round London, and championed a Channel Tunnel initiative. He also sat on committees that oversaw the repairs to the Palace of Westminster.

Works
Bull published:

The Book of Limericks (1916), with "Orion" (sports editor William Warren) of The Daily Express, illustrations by Heath Robinson.
 A History of the Broadway Congregational Church, Hammersmith (1923).

Family
Bull married Lilian Hester Brandon, daughter of Gabriel Samuel Brandon, on 5 January 1904. They had four sons. He was succeeded in the baronetcy by his eldest son Stephen. His third son, Anthony Bull, was Chairman of London Transport from 1965 to 1971. His youngest son, Peter Bull, became a well-known character actor. Lady Bull died on 3 September 1963.

References

External links

The Papers of Sir William Bull held at Churchill Archives Centre, Cambridge

1863 births
1931 deaths
Baronets in the Baronetage of the United Kingdom
Conservative Party (UK) MPs for English constituencies
Hammersmith
UK MPs 1900–1906
UK MPs 1906–1910
UK MPs 1910
UK MPs 1910–1918
UK MPs 1918–1922
UK MPs 1922–1923
UK MPs 1923–1924
UK MPs 1924–1929
Members of the Privy Council of the United Kingdom
English solicitors
Members of London County Council